Guipi Wan is a brown honeyed pill used in Traditional Chinese medicine to "invigorate the spleen function, nourish blood and cause sedation". It has a slight odor, and tastes sweet, and then slightly bitter and pungent. It is used where there is "deficiency syndrome of both the heart and the spleen marked by shortness of breath, cardiac palpitation, insomnia, dream-disturbed sleep, dizziness, lassitude, anorexia, excessive menstrual discharge or hematochezia".

Chinese classic herbal formula of Guipi Wan

See also
 Chinese classic herbal formula
 Bu Zhong Yi Qi Wan

References

Traditional Chinese medicine pills